Nerf is a brand of toy and can also refer to the foam that these toys use.

Nerf may also refer to:
 New Ets-related factor, transcription factor also known as ELF2
 Nerf (Star Wars), a fictional animal in the Star Wars universe
 Nerf (video gaming), a change to a game that reduces the desirability or effectiveness of a particular game element
 Nerf bar, a tubular step fitted to the side of a truck or SUV to facilitate easy entry and exit
 Neural Radiance Fields (NeRF)
 Nirma Education and Research Foundation, patron of Nirma University

See also
 Narf (disambiguation)
 Norf
 NYRF (disambiguation)